William Perley may refer to:
 William Goodhue Perley, Canadian businessman and member of the House of Commons of Canada 
 William E. Perley, farmer, lumberman and political figure in New Brunswick, Canada
 William Dell Perley, farmer and politician from western Canada